The Green Line is a  METRORail light rail/streetcar line operated by METRO in Houston, Texas, serving the East End area. The first seven-station segment of this line opened on  May 23, 2015. The two-station eastern end of this route was delayed due to issues over crossing Union Pacific Railroad tracks, but eventually opened in January 2017.

Route
Between Theater District and EaDo/Stadium stations, the Green Line shares tracks with the Purple Line. In downtown, the eastbound track runs along Capitol Street, while its westbound counterpart runs along Rusk Street. On both of these streets, trains operate in mixed traffic using the rightmost lane. Transfers to the Red Line will occur at the Fannin Station. Before crossing I-69/US 59, the 2 tracks converge onto a dedicated right-of-way along the south side of Texas Avenue to EaDo/Stadium Station, which will give access to the BBVA Compass Stadium where the MLS soccer team Houston Dynamo & Texas Southern Tigers football play. East of EaDo/Stadium Station, the Green Line and the Purple Line diverge, with the Purple Line turning south and the East End Line continuing east.

The Green line continues in a dedicated right-of-way on the south side of Harrisburg Road, which transitions to the center of Harrisburg Road at Middleton Street.  It remains in the median to its eastern terminus at Altic/Howard Hughes Station.

In the future, a six-block-long bridge will carry the line over freight rail tracks located on Harrisburg and Hughes, extending the line eastward to the Magnolia Transit Center. Construction of this bridge began in March 2015.

Construction

Phase I of construction was due to be completed by spring 2012, with Phase II scheduled to be complete by summer 2012, and a planned opening in 2013 or 2014. By fall 2010, it became clear that a late 2013 opening was impossible, and the line would not open until late 2014.

Problems with non-MetroRAIL construction projects downtown, as well as with the axle-counters used to regulate light rail traffic, subsequently pushed back the opening of the line to April and then May 2015.

Opposition to east end of line
As early as about a month after construction began for this line, it was reported that there opposition existed to this line, particularly because of the installation of the six-block-long bridge meant to avoid the freight railroad at the east end of the line. Further opposition to this line arose when area resident began to notice a loss in business in areas where construction was taking place. Subsequently, Metro decided to build the western portion of the line in the meantime, while the construction of the portion of the line between Altic/Howard Hughes Station and Magnolia Transit Center Station was deferred.

An overpass segment meant to avoid the freight railroad track and to complete the line between Altic/Howard Hughes Station and Magnolia Transit Center is expected to take up to 18 months to complete and broke ground in March, 2015. The bridge was completed in early 2017, and the first train traveled across it on January 9, with regular service beginning on the 11th, which marked the completion of the Green Line to its Magnolia terminus.

Stations
The following is a list of stations for the Green Line, listed in order from west to east.

METRORail line key
 Red Line Purple Line

Expansion
A possible expansion for the line would bring it south from the Magnolia Transit Center to converge with the Purple Line at a station yet to be named, and moving along the same right-of-way to Hobby Airport.

See also
 METRORail Purple Line

References

Knight, Paul (January 22, 2010). "Light Rail Construction On The East End Line Not Going Smoothly For Businessowners." Houston Press.

External links
METRO Official Website
Go METRORail

METRORail
Railway lines opened in 2015
2015 establishments in Texas